Gertrude Wheeler Beckman was an American author, composer, lyricist, singing teacher and phonologist. Her book on singing technique, Tools for Speaking and Singing, was published in 1955. She also inspired William Francis Giauque to study chemistry, the subject of his Nobel Prize in 1949.

Biography
Beckman was born in Oakland, California in 1879, one of the three children of Charles C. and Angelina (or Angeline) (née Stetson) Wheeler. One of her brothers, Charles Stetson Wheeler, became a politician and attorney while the other, William Riley Wheeler, did not attend college. She became a singing teacher and phonologist.

She married John W. Beckman, an electrochemical engineer who worked in Niagara Falls, New York for the American Cyanamid Company. They employed Isabella Giauque as a seamstress around 1908 who had recently been widowed leaving her family in difficult financial circumstances. Giauque asked Beckman to talk with her son, William Francis Giauque, about his plan to take a business course so that he could become employed as soon as possible, rather than do as his mother wanted and embark on longer studies leading to a college degree. Beckman described the contrasting careers of her two brothers to the young man, emphasising the value of education. As a result of this conversation, and later advice from Beckman, he started on a path that took him to study chemistry at University of California, Berkeley and then remain in academic science. He was eventually awarded the Nobel Prize for chemistry in 1949.  The Beckmans later moved to Berkeley, California.

She taught singing to opera and folk singers, including Richard Dyer-Bennet. She also wrote music and lyrics for songs. At least one survives from 1911, We are here, LaFayette!. In 1955, her book Tools for Speaking and Singing was published. The content was about techniques for singing, especially learning to produce the sounds as a reflex action, rather than through direct control of muscles. The principles of this approach were described in the first half of the book, followed by practical applications. A reviewer considered that this was an excellent approach and description although parts could have been written more clearly. Beckman had developed this approach with her friend and colleague the soprano Ida Auer-Herbeck.

Publications
 Gertrude Wheeler Beckman. Tools for Speaking and Singing (original author copyright 1948 Berkely, Ca.) G. Schirmer, New York. 157pp

References

1879 births
Date of death unknown
American women educators
20th-century American non-fiction writers
20th-century American women writers
Date of death not in Wikidata